was a town located in Sado Island, Niigata Prefecture, Japan.

On March 1, 2004, Aikawa and the other 9 municipalities in the island were merged to create the city of Sado. Since then, Aikawa has been one of the 10 subdivisions of Sado City.

History

Transportation

Bus
 Niigata Kotsu Sado

Local attractions

 Aikawa Gold and Silver Mine (Sado mine)
 Kitazawa Flotation Plant (:ja:北沢浮遊選鉱場)
 Aikawa Folk Museum
 Sado bugyōsho
 Senkakuwan Bay (:ja:尖閣湾)

See also
Sado, Niigata
Sado mine
Sado bugyō

References

External links
Sado Tourism Association 
The Sado Complex of Heritage Mines, Primarily Gold Mines (Sado City Government's website) 

Dissolved municipalities of Niigata Prefecture